Slobodishcha is a rural locality (a village) in Rostilovskoye Rural Settlement, Gryazovetsky District, Vologda Oblast, Russia. The population was 17 as of 2002. There are 2 streets.

Geography 
Slobodishcha is located 19 km northwest of Gryazovets (the district's administrative centre) by road. Khaymino is the nearest rural locality.

References 

Rural localities in Gryazovetsky District